Gerhard Gyllenhammar (7 February 1873 – 16 September 1968) was a Swedish painter. His work was part of the painting event in the art competition at the 1936 Summer Olympics.

References

1873 births
1968 deaths
20th-century Swedish painters
Swedish male painters
Olympic competitors in art competitions
Artists from Stockholm
20th-century Swedish male artists